Thomas Day (22 June 1748 – 28 September 1789) was a British author and abolitionist. He was well known for the book The History of Sandford and Merton (1783–1789) which emphasized Rousseauvian educational ideals, for his writings against slavery, for campaigning both for and against American independence, and for his project applying his educational ideals to young girls with the aim of raising a wife for himself.

Early life
Day was born on 22 June 1748 in London, the only child of Thomas and Jane Day. His father died when he was about a year old, but left him wealthy. He first attended a school in Stoke Newington, Middlesex, where the family lived at what is now 109-111 Church Street, but after a bout of smallpox which left his face permanently scarred he was moved to Charterhouse School. He subsequently attended Corpus Christi College, Oxford, where he became a master debater and developed a close friendship with William Jones; he did not graduate and left the college in 1767.

Life
Day moved back to his family estate at Barehill, Berkshire, in 1766. There he met the progressive educator and inventor Richard Lovell Edgeworth, from whom he became almost inseparable. Together they resolved to educate Edgeworth's son, Dick, in the style of Jean-Jacques Rousseau's Emile. Edgeworth and the project converted Day to Rousseauism. He declared in 1769 that the two books he would save, were all the world's books to be destroyed, would be the Bible and Emile. Day, Edgeworth and his son would later visit Rousseau in France. Because of his connection with Edgeworth, Day joined the Lunar Society in Lichfield, despite describing himself as a philosopher rather than a scientist, and formed friendships with Erasmus Darwin and Anna Seward.

Sabrina Sidney

After this education project, Day undertook a second: he tried to train a wife. According to Anna Seward (who nevertheless observed that "there was no finding such a creature ready made"), his demands were modest: "He resolved, if possible, that his wife should have a taste for literature and science, for moral and patriotic philosophy. So might she be his companion in that retirement, to which he had destined himself; and assist him forming the minds of his children to stubborn virtue and high exertion. He resolved also, that she should be simple as a mountain girl, in her dress, her diet and her manners, fearless and intrepid as the Spartan wives and Roman heroines."

Using Edgeworth's name, Day applied to the Foundling Hospital to take first one and then another girl, initially aged 12 and 11; he told the Hospital that they were to be apprenticed as maids in Edgeworth's household, which Edgeworth did not know of until several months later. He renamed them from Ann Kingston and Dorcas Car to Sabrina Sidney and Lucretia, respectively. What last name he chose for 'Lucretia' is not known. He made a donation of fifty pounds to the Foundling Hospital and was appointed a member of the governing board.

After living in London with Sabrina Sidney for some time, Day took both girls to France in November 1769. His motives are unclear, as Day was a committed Francophobe, but leaving the country put him out of the reach of British law and the lawyers of the Foundling Hospital, who had been known to sue apprentice-masters who mistreated their apprentices. It also let him isolate the girls; he refused to hire English-speaking staff and would not let anyone teach the girls French. At one time he challenged a French military officer to a duel for speaking to one of the girls.

In the spring of 1770, Day decided that Lucretia, then aged 12, could not satisfy him intellectually as a wife, and returned to England, placing her in the home of a milliner's family in Ludgate Hill with a payment of £400. With Sabrina, he leased Stowe House in Lichfield, near Edgeworth and the Lunar Society. At this point he still had not informed Sabrina, then aged 13, of his designs, and told her she was apprenticed to him as a servant. According to Rousseau, who had described how children should be taught not to fear pain or physical hardship, Day embarked on a programme of 'lessons,' including dripping hot candle-wax onto Sabrina's arms and forcing her to wade into cold water up to her neck. He also shot at her skirts with a pistol; accounts are divided on whether it was loaded. By 1771, Day had decided to abandon his 'experiment,' and sent Sabrina to stay at a boarding school for the rest of her childhood.

Still living in Lichfield, he proposed marriage to Honora Sneyd, who would later marry his friend Edgeworth, and then proposed the same to her sister Elizabeth, who was briefly engaged to him but broke it off.

He met Esther Milnes (1753–1792), an heiress from Chesterfield, and they were married on 7 August 1778. The couple subsequently moved to a small estate at Stapleford Abbotts, near Abridge in Essex. They lived a very ascetic lifestyle and Esther was not allowed to contact her family. In 1780, the couple moved to Anningsley in Surrey, when Day bought a new estate there. It was a philanthropic project for both husband and wife and they laboured to improve the conditions of the working classes around them.

Publications and political works
In 1773, Day published his first work—The Dying Negro—a poem he had written with John Bicknell. It tells the story of a runaway slave, and sold well.

The contradiction between the claim that "all men are created equal" and the existence of American slavery attracted comment from some quarters when the United States Declaration of Independence was first published; Congress, having made a few changes in wording, deleted nearly a fourth of the draft before publication, most notably removing a passage critical of the slave trade, as there were members of Congress who owned black slaves. Day was among those who noted the discrepancy, writing in 1776: "If there be an object truly ridiculous in nature, it is an American patriot, signing resolutions of independency with the one hand, and with the other brandishing a whip over his affrighted slaves."

Day decided to study the law and in 1776 was admitted to Lincoln's Inn; he rarely practised.

Day argued for the rights of the American colonists in his poem "The Devoted Legions" (1776) and in 1780 he argued in Parliament for an early peace with the revolutionaries as well as parliamentary reform. His speeches were also published as pamphlets.

It was as a writer for children that Day made his reputation. The History of Little Jack (1787) was extremely popular, but it could not match the sales of The History of Sandford and Merton (1783, 1786, 1789) which was a bestseller for over a hundred years. Embracing Rousseau's dictates in many ways, it narrates the story of the rich, noble but spoiled Tommy Merton and his poor but virtuous friend Harry Sandford. Through trials and stories, Harry and the boys' tutor teach Tommy the importance of labor and the evils of the idle rich.

Death
Day was thrown from his horse while trying to break it using kindness at Barehill, Berkshire, on 28 September 1789 and died almost instantly. He was buried at St Mary's Church, Wargrave, Berkshire.

See also

List of abolitionist forerunners

References

General references

 
 
 
 
Jefferson, Cord, "A British Intellectual's Mission 'To Create The Perfect Wife'" (review), NPR, 30 April 2013.
 
 
 
 Uglow, Jenny. The Lunar Men: Five Friends Whose Curiosity Changed the World. New York: Farrar, Straus and Giroux, 2002. .

External links

 Thomas Day from Brycchan Carey's listing of British abolitionists 
 
 

1748 births
1789 deaths
English abolitionists
English children's writers
People from Lichfield
18th-century English male writers
Deaths by horse-riding accident in England
Writers from London
Alumni of Corpus Christi College, Oxford